Hottinger or Hottinguer is a surname. Notable people with the surname include:

Swiss family

Klaus Hottinger (1467–1524), first martyr of the Swiss Protestantism movement
Johann Heinrich Hottinger (1620–1667), Swiss philologist and theologian
Johann Jakob Hottinger (1652–1735), Swiss theologian and Church historian
Johann Jakob Hottinger (1783–1860), Swiss historian
Jean–Conrad Hottinger (1764–1841), Swiss-born banker who later became Baron Hottinguer of the French empire
Jean–Henri Hottinger (1803–1866), first-born son of Baron Jean-Conrad Hottinger and the second Baron Hottinguer
Rodolphe Hottinger (1835-1920), first-born son of Baron Jean-Henri Hottinguer and the third Baron Hottinguer 
Henri Hottinger (1868–1943), first-born son of Rodolphe Hottingue and the fourth Baron Hottinguer
Rodolphe Hottinger (1902–1985), Swiss banker, fifth Baron Hottinguer 
Rodolphe Hottinger (1956-), Swiss banker, seventh Baron Hottinguer 
Mary Hottinger (1893 – 1978), née Mackie, Scottish translator and author

Other

Jay Hottinger (born 1969), Republican member of the Ohio House of Representatives
John Hottinger (born 1945), Minnesota politician and a former member and majority leader of the Minnesota Senate 	
Lukas Hottinger (born 1933), paleontologist, biologist and geologist.
Markus Höttinger (1956–1980), Austrian Formula Two driver

See also
Hottinger Group
hottinguer family